EWC may refer to:

Educational bodies

United States
 East–West Center, Hawaii
 Eastern Wyoming College, Wyoming
 Edward Waters College, Florida
 Elder Wisdom Circle, California

Elsewhere
 Education Workforce Council, Wales
 Encounters with Canada, defunct youth program

Government and law
 East–West Center, federally-funded cultural interchange program in Hawaii, U.S.
 Endangering the welfare of a child
 Export Wheat Commission of Australia
 Expropriation without compensation, in South Africa

Science and technology
 Earth Watchers Center, in Iran
 Exchange Web Connect (EWC), a web app

Sports competitions
 Eastern Wisconsin Conference, a high school athletic conference in Wisconsin, United States
 Euro Winners Cup, beach soccer competition
 EWC, a motorcycle racing series also known as FIM Endurance World Championship

Trade unions and professional bodies
 Education Workforce Council, Wales
 European Writers' Council
 European Works Council

Other uses
 European Wax Center, an American chain of hair removal salons
 Evangelical Wesleyan Church, a Methodist denomination
 Express Written Consent, an American talk show